May Nights is a 1952 Soviet 3D comedy film released by  Moscow Gorky Film Studios, directed by Aleksandr Rou and starring Nikolai Dosenko, Tatyana Konyukhova and Aleksandr Khvylya. It is based on Nikolai Gogol's May Night, or the Drowned Maiden and the subsequent opera version by Nikolai Rimsky-Korsakov. It was directed by  Alexander Rowe. The film is notable for being the first full-length autostereoscopic film in colour.

Cast
 Nikolai Dosenko as Levko Makogonenko  
 Tatyana Konyukhova as Hanna Petrichenkova  
 Aleksandr Khvylya as Evtukh Makogonenko, village leader  
 Liliya Yudina as The Officer's Daughter  
 Galina Grigoreva as The Witch-Stepmother  
 Georgiy Millyar as The Village Clerk 
 E. Cheoarskaya as Evtukh's Sister-in-law  
 Aleksandr Zhukov as Karpo, a villager  
 G. Nelidov as A Beekeeper  
 Anton Dunajsky as A Distiller 
 Vasili Bokarev 
 Georgi Gumilevsky

References

Bibliography 
 Rollberg, Peter. Historical Dictionary of Russian and Soviet Cinema. Scarecrow Press, 2008.

External links 
 

1952 films
1952 comedy films
Soviet comedy films
Russian comedy films
1950s Russian-language films
Films directed by Aleksandr Rou
Gorky Film Studio films
Films based on works by Nikolai Gogol
Films based on fairy tales
1950s 3D films